Larecaja is a province in the Bolivian La Paz Department. It was founded by Antonio José de Sucre on October 18, 1826. Its capital is Sorata.

Geography 
The Cordillera Real traverses the province. Some of the highest peaks of the province are  Illampu and Janq'u Uma. Other mountains are listed below:

Parts of the Apolobamba Integrated Management Natural Area and the Pilón Lajas Biosphere Reserve and Communal Lands lie in the Larecaja Province.

Subdivision 
Larecaja Province is divided into eight municipalities which are partly further subdivided into cantons.

Languages 
The languages spoken in the Larecaja Province are mainly Aymara, Spanish and Quechua. The following table shows the number of those belonging to the recognised group of speakers.

See also 
 Ch'alla Quta
 Ch'uch'u Jawira
 Ch'usiq Uta
 Janq'u Quta
 Warus Quta
 Laguna Glaciar, 17th highest lake in the world.

References 

 www.ine.gov.bo / census 2001

Provinces of La Paz Department (Bolivia)